Hristijan Kirovski (born 12 October 1985) is a Macedonian footballer who currently plays as a forward for Skopje in the Macedonian Second Football League.

Career

Club
Kirovski began playing football with local side FK Vardar. He joined OFK Belgrade for 3.5 years, spending the last six months on loan at Ukrainian Premier League side FC Metalurh Zaporizhya. After his contract with OFK was finished, Kirovski moved to Cyprus to join Ethnikos Achna FC for six months. He returned to Vardar, where he enjoyed success, scoring 11 goals in 10 matches. However at age 21, Ukrainian Premier League side FC Karpaty Lviv acquired Kirovski in August 2007. In January 2013 Kirovski signed for Greek Football League club Iraklis. He joined Bulgarian club CSKA Sofia in mid July 2013, signing a two-year contract with the team. He had difficulties establishing himself as the first choice for his position and eventually relocated to Poland, signing with GKS Bełchatów.

On 24 June 2019 it was confirmed, that Kirovski had joined FC Struga.

International career
He made his senior debut for Macedonia in a November 2010 friendly match against Albania and has earned a total of 2 caps, scoring no goals. His second and final international was a December 2010 friendly against China.

Career statistics

References

External links
 Profile at MacedonianFootball.com
 Profile at FFU website 
 

1985 births
Living people
Footballers from Skopje
Association football forwards
Macedonian footballers
North Macedonia youth international footballers
North Macedonia under-21 international footballers
North Macedonia international footballers
FK Vardar players
OFK Beograd players
FC Metalurh Zaporizhzhia players
FK Makedonija Gjorče Petrov players
Ethnikos Achna FC players
FK Rabotnički players
FC Vaslui players
FK Skopje players
Apollon Limassol FC players
Hapoel Nir Ramat HaSharon F.C. players
Iraklis Thessaloniki F.C. players
PFC CSKA Sofia players
GKS Bełchatów players
KF Shkëndija players
Hristijan Kirovski
Hristijan Kirovski
FC Struga players
KF Gostivari players
Macedonian First Football League players
First League of Serbia and Montenegro players
Ukrainian Premier League players
Cypriot First Division players
Liga I players
Israeli Premier League players
Football League (Greece) players
First Professional Football League (Bulgaria) players
I liga players
Hristijan Kirovski
Macedonian expatriate footballers
Expatriate footballers in Serbia and Montenegro
Expatriate footballers in Ukraine
Expatriate footballers in Cyprus
Expatriate footballers in Romania
Expatriate footballers in Israel
Expatriate footballers in Greece
Expatriate footballers in Bulgaria
Expatriate footballers in Poland
Expatriate footballers in Thailand
Macedonian expatriate sportspeople in Serbia and Montenegro
Macedonian expatriate sportspeople in Ukraine
Macedonian expatriate sportspeople in Cyprus
Macedonian expatriate sportspeople in Romania
Macedonian expatriate sportspeople in Israel
Macedonian expatriate sportspeople in Greece
Macedonian expatriate sportspeople in Bulgaria
Macedonian expatriate sportspeople in Poland
Macedonian expatriate sportspeople in Thailand